Subtype may refer to:

 Viral subtypes, such as Subtypes of HIV
 Subtyping, a form of type polymorphism in programming language theory